Edwin Maxwell (9 February 1886 – 13 August 1948) was an Irish character actor on in Hollywood movies of the 1930s and 1940s, frequently cast as shady businessmen and shysters, though often ones with a pompous or dignified bearing. Prior to that, he was an actor on the Broadway stage and a director of plays.

Early life 
Maxwell was a native of Dublin.

Career 
In the late 1920s, Maxwell directed and acted in plays with the New York Theater Guild Repertory Company.

From 1939 to 1942, Maxwell served as the dialogue director for the films of epic director Cecil B. DeMille.  Maxwell appeared in four Academy Award-winning Best Pictures: All Quiet on the Western Front (1930), Grand Hotel (1932), The Great Ziegfeld (1936) and You Can't Take It with You (1938).

Filmography

 The Taming of the Shrew (1929, film debut) as Baptista
 All Quiet on the Western Front (1930) as Mr. Bäumer (uncredited)
 Top Speed (1930) as J.W. Rollins (uncredited)
 Du Barry, Woman of Passion (1930) as Maupeou
 The Gorilla (1930) as Cyrus Stevens
 Inspiration (1931) as Uncle Julian Montell
 Kiki (1931) as Dr. Smiley
 Daybreak (1931) as Herr Hoffman
 Daddy Long Legs (1931) as Wykoff (uncredited)
 Men of the Sky (1931) as Count
 The Magnificent Lie (1931) as Eye Specialist (uncredited)
 New Adventures of Get Rich Quick Wallingford (1931) as Adam Carver the Hotel Manager (uncredited)
 Wicked (1931) as Owner of property
 The Yellow Ticket (1931) as Police Agent Boligoff
 Ambassador Bill (1931) as Monte Montgomery
 Two Kinds of Women (1932) as Deputy Police Commissioner (uncredited)
 The Impatient Maiden (1932) as Prof. Von Mueller (uncredited)
 Shopworn (1932) as Bierbauer (uncredited)
 The Cohens and Kellys in Hollywood (1932) as Chauncey Chadwick
 Scarface (1932) as Chief of Detectives
 Young Bride (1932) as The Doctor
 Grand Hotel (1932) as Dr. Waitz
 The World and the Flesh (1932) (uncredited)
 The Trial of Vivienne Ware (1932) as Detective (uncredited)
 The Strange Case of Clara Deane (1932) as Judge (uncredited)
 While Paris Sleeps (1932) as Prison Commandant (uncredited)
 Merrily We Go to Hell (1932) as Jake Symonds (uncredited)
 American Madness (1932) as Clark (uncredited)
 Blessed Event (1932) as Sam Gobel
 Those We Love (1932) as Marshall
 Tiger Shark (1932) as Doctor (uncredited)
 Six Hours to Live (1932) as Police Commissioner
 The Girl from Calgary (1932) as Earl Darrell
 You Said a Mouthful (1932) as Dr. Vorse
 The Son-Daughter (1932) as Chinese Priest (uncredited)
 Frisco Jenny (1932) as Tom Ford (uncredited)
 Tonight Is Ours (1933) as Mob Leader
 State Trooper (1933) as W.J. Brady
 Mystery of the Wax Museum (1933) as Joe Worth
 Night of Terror (1933) as The Maniac
 Emergency Call (1933) as Tom Rourke
 Heroes for Sale (1933) as Laundry Company President
 Gambling Ship (1933) as D.A
 The Mayor of Hell (1933) as Louis Johnson
 The Woman I Stole (1933) as Lentz
 The Man Who Dared (1933) as Fletcher (uncredited)
 The Narrow Corner (1933) as Man Fred Killed (uncredited)
 Dinner at Eight (1933) as Mr. Fitch, Hotel Manager
 This Day and Age (1933) as Mayor's Assistant (uncredited)
 Broadway to Hollywood (1933) as Rockwell (uncredited)
 I Loved a Woman (1933) as Gossiper (uncredited)
 Ann Vickers (1933) as Defense Attorney (uncredited)
 Police Car 17 (1933) as Big Bill Standish
 Big Time or Bust (1933) as Winthrop Allen
 Fog (1933) as Ship Captain
 Duck Soup (1933) as Freedonia's Former Secretary of War
 Christopher Bean (1933) as Auctioneer (uncredited)
 Lady Killer (1933) as Jeffries, Theatre Manager (uncredited)
 Miss Fane's Baby Is Stolen (1934) as Judge (uncredited)
 The Ninth Guest (1934) as Jason Osgood
 This Side of Heaven (1934) as R.S. Sawyer (uncredited)
 Dancing Man (1934) as Morton Randall
 Mystery Liner (1934) as Major Pope
 Hollywood Party (1934) as Producer Buddy Goldfarb (uncredited)
 The Life of Vergie Winters (1934) as Rally Speaker (uncredited)
 Burn 'Em Up Barnes (1934) as Lyman Warren
 Back Page (1934) as Martin Regal
 The Cat's-Paw (1934) as District Attorney Neal
 Gift of Gab (1934) as Norton, President WGAB
 Cleopatra (1934) as Casca
 Elinor Norton (1934) as Army Doctor (uncredited)
 All the King's Horses (1935) as First Gentleman (uncredited)
 Great God Gold (1935) as Nitto
 G Men (1935) as Joseph Kratz (uncredited)
 The Devil Is a Woman (1935) as Tobacco Plant Manager (uncredited)
 Motive for Revenge (1935) as William King
 Men of Action (1935) as Jefferson, Crooked Banker
 The Crusades (1935) as Ship's Master (uncredited)
 Happiness C.O.D. (1935) as Lester Walsh
 The Last Days of Pompeii (1935) as The Augur, a Pompeii Official (uncredited)
 Thanks a Million (1935) as Mr. Casey
 Dangerous Waters (1936) as Mr. Brunch
 The Great Ziegfeld (1936) as Charles Frohman (uncredited)
 Big Brown Eyes (1936) as Editor
 Mr. Deeds Goes to Town (1936) as Douglas (uncredited)
 Panic on the Air (1936) as Gordon
 Absolute Quiet (1936) as Mr. Baxter (uncredited)
 Fury (1936) as Will Vickery
 To Mary - with Love (1936) as Byron C. Wakefield
 Come and Get It (1936) as Sid LeMaire
 The Plainsman (1936) as Secretary of War Edwin Stanton (uncredited)
 Camille (1936) as Doctor (uncredited)
 A Man Betrayed (1936) as Richards
 Torture Money (1937, Short) as Milton Beacher
 Love Is News (1937) as Kenyon
 Night Key (1937) as Kruger
 A Star Is Born (1937) as Vocal Coach (uncredited)
 The Road Back (1937) as Principal
 Slave Ship (1937) as Auctioneer
 Slim (1937) as Corton (uncredited)
 One Hundred Men and a Girl (1937) as Ira Westing, Editor (uncredited)
 Love Takes Flight (1937) as Dave Miller
 Nothing Sacred (1937) as Mr. Bullock (uncredited)
 Paradise for Three (1938) as First Lawyer (uncredited)
 Romance on the Run (1938) as Mondoon
 Hold That Kiss (1938) as Theatre Manager (uncredited)
 The Rage of Paris (1938) as Hotel Manager (uncredited)
 Rich Man, Poor Girl (1938) as Mr. Krauss, the Shoe Store Manager (uncredited)
 You Can't Take It with You (1938) as Attorney to Kirby (uncredited)
 Vacation from Love (1938) as Samson Hatfield (uncredited)
 Made for Each Other (1939) as Messerschmidt (uncredited)
 Young Mr. Lincoln (1939) as John T. Stuart (uncredited)
 Way Down South (1939) as Martin Dill
 Drums Along the Mohawk (1939) as Reverend Daniel Gros
 Ninotchka (1939) as Mercier
 The Shop Around the Corner (1940) as Doctor
 His Girl Friday (1940) as Dr. Max J. Eggelhoffer
 The Blue Bird (1940) as Oak
 Pound Foolish (1940, Short) as George Reynolds (uncredited)
 Parole Fixer (1940) as Edward Murkil (uncredited)
 Jack Pot (1940, Short) as Rocky Fallon
 New Moon (1940) as Captain de Jean
 Brigham Young (1940) as 2nd Mob Leader
 Kit Carson (1940) as John Sutter
 The Devil and Miss Jones  (1941) as Withers
 Ride on Vaquero (1941) as Dan Clark
 Blossoms in the Dust (1941) as City Councilman (uncredited)
 Buy Me That Town (1941) as P.V. Baxter
 Pacific Blackout (1941) as District Attorney
 Know for Sure (1942, Short) as Dr. Paxton (uncredited)
 Ten Gentlemen from West Point (1942) as Sen. John Randolph
 I Live on Danger (1942) as Wingy Keefe
 Street of Chance (1942) as Stillwell, D.A.
 Behind Prison Walls (1943) as Percy Webb
 Heaven Can Wait (1943) as Doctor (uncredited)
 Holy Matrimony (1943) as King Edward VII (uncredited)
 Waterfront (1944) as Max Kramer
 Since You Went Away (1944) as Businessman in Cocktail Lounge (uncredited)
 The Great Moment (1944) as Vice-President of Medical Society
 Wilson (1944) as William Jennings Bryan
 Practically Yours (1944) as Radio Official (uncredited)
 The Great John L. (1945) as Exhibition Ring Announcer (uncredited)
 Mama Loves Papa (1945) as Kirkwood
 Swamp Fire (1946) as Capt. Pierre Moise
 The Jolson Story (1946) as Oscar Hammerstein (uncredited)
 Second Chance (1947) as Mr. Davenport
 The Gangster (1947) as Johnny, Politician (uncredited)
 Campus Honeymoon (1948) as Sen. Hughes
 The Vicious Circle (1948) as Presiding Judge
 The Walls of Jericho (1948) as Porter Grimes (uncredited) (final film role)

References

External links

 
 
 
 

1886 births
1948 deaths
Irish male film actors
Irish male stage actors
Male actors from Dublin (city)
Irish emigrants to the United States
20th-century Irish male actors